George Christian (6 February 1634, Aurich – 6 June 1665, Aurich) was a member of the Cirksena family and succeeded his brother Enno Louis as ruler of East Frisia.  He ruled from 1660 to 1665. Under his reign, the Cirksena family acquired on 18 April 1662 the hereditary title of Imperial Prince.

George Christian grew up with his brother at the court in Aurich. After 1649, they received further education at the academies of Breda and Tübingen. In Tübingen he met his future wife, Christine Charlotte, a daughter of Duke Eberhard III of Württemberg from his first marriage to Anna Dorothea of Salm-Kyrburg. He could only marry her after had he received the hereditary title of Imperial Prince on 18 April 1662. This gave him the proper rank to marry a Princess of Württemberg, and so the marriage was finally performed on 10 May 1662 in the city of Stuttgart. The union produced only two short-lived daughters during George Christian's lifetime: Eberhardine Katharina (25 May 1663 – 10 July 1664) and Juliane Charlotte (3 January 1664 – 3 June 1666).

Immediately after his accession he was trying to establish his rule, which led to severe conflicts with the Estates. This soon reached the threshold of a civil war and could be settled only by Dutch mediation. After lengthy negotiations with the Estates on 19 June 1662 and 4 October 1663, a compromise was reached.  The Netherlands became the guarantor power. In both treaties, the relationship between the prince and the Estates was regulated.  The estates were given back their old privileges, in exchange for a substantial cash payment.

Under George Christian, the conflict with Münster escalated. This conflict was based on compensation East Frisia had to pay under the Treaty of Berum, in exchange for the acquisition of the Harlingerland. Under the pretext of enforcing the payments, the Bishop of Münster marched his troops into East Frisia in 1663. Colonel Elverfeld conquered Hampoel and the Sconce at Diele on East Frisia's southern border.  These were recaptured by Dutch troops in 1664. George Christian preferred to leave this kind of problem of his officials or the Estates.

Four months after his untimely death, George Christian's third child was born: a son named Christian Everhard. His widow, Christine Charlotte, led a rather unfortunate regency for the next 25 years.

Ancestors

References and sources 
Tielke, Martin (ed.): Biographisches Lexikon für Ostfriesland, Ostfriesisches Landschaftliche Verlag- und Vertriebsgeschäft, Aurich, vol. 1  (1993), vol. 2  (1997), vol. 3  (2001)
 Ernst Kaeber: Bilder aus dem Leben ostfries. Fürstlichkeiten des 17. Jahrhunderts. I. Die jüngeren Brüder des Fürsten Enno Ludwig. II. Aus dem Leben des Fürsten Christian Eberhard, Aurich, 1912
 Ernst Kaeber: Die Jugendzeit Fürst Enno Ludwigs von Ostfriesland, Aurich, 1911

1634 births
1665 deaths
Princes of East Frisia